Samuel Waldo (August 7, 1696 – May 23, 1759) was an American merchant, land speculator, army officer and politician in the Province of Massachusetts Bay.

Biography
He was born in Boston, the son of Jonathan Waldo and Hannah Mason. In 1722, he married Lucy Wainwright. In 1730, he purchased a 17th-century title to a large tract of land in Nova Scotia with the intent of establishing a colony there; the title did not stand up when he proposed this plan to the authorities in England.  A one-time business partner of Colonel Thomas Westbrook, Waldo acquired a large tract of land between the Penobscot and Muscongus Rivers in what is now Maine where he settled Irish and German immigrants and purchased several slaves.

During King George's War, he served as brigadier-general in the reduction on Louisbourg Fortress in 1745 and served on the temporary council that administered the settlement until Peter Warren was named governor. In 1757, during the French and Indian War, he submitted a plan to William Pitt which served as a basis for the second capture of Louisbourg from the French the following year. Waldo died of apoplexy near present-day Bangor, Maine in 1759 while participating in a military expedition with Governor Thomas Pownall.  He was initially buried at Fort Pownall (at Cape Jellison), but his remains were transported to Boston in 1760 and interred at the King's Chapel Burying Ground.

The Maine towns of Waldo and Waldoboro, together with Waldo County, are named for their early proprietor.

His son-in-law Thomas Flucker was royal secretary of Massachusetts and later Provincial Governor. His granddaughter, Lucy Flucker Knox, married Revolutionary War hero and founding father Henry Knox. The Knox family built the impressive Montpelier on Waldo's tract of land in Thomaston, Maine.

See also
 Waldo Patent
 Colonel Thomas Westbrook
 Thomas Westbrook Waldron

References

Further reading
 The Lithgow Family-Descendants of John Bridge, 1884, by William Frederick Bridge

1696 births
1759 deaths
People of King George's War
American slave owners
British America army officers
American militia generals
People of Massachusetts in the French and Indian War
Military personnel from colonial Massachusetts
People of colonial Maine
People from colonial Boston
People of pre-statehood Maine
Deaths from bleeding
Burials in Boston